Jamāl-al-Din Moḥammad Sidi (1555–1591) was a Persian poet. He lived from 963 AH-999 AH; c. 1556-1590 CE; known by his pen-name Urfi, or Orfi or Urfi Shirazi, was a 16th-century Persian poet.

He was born in Shiraz and in his youth, he migrated to India and became one of the poets of the court of Akbar the Great. He is one of the most prominent Persian poets of Indian style.

References

External links
عرفی شیرازی, Dehkhoda Dictionary
List of Persian poets and authors
Persian literature

16th-century Persian-language writers
16th-century Persian-language poets
1550s births
1590 deaths
Year of birth uncertain
Iranian emigrants to the Mughal Empire